Kim Min-june (born 27 January 1994) is a South Korean footballer currently playing as a defender for Gimhae FC.

Career statistics

Club

Notes

References

1994 births
Living people
Hannam University alumni
South Korean footballers
Association football forwards
K League 1 players
Korea National League players
K3 League players
Gangwon FC players
Busan Transportation Corporation FC players
Gimhae FC players